German submarine U-321 was a Type VIIC/41 U-boat of Nazi Germany's Kriegsmarine during World War II.

She carried out two patrols, but did not sink any ships.

The boat was sunk on 2 April 1945 by a Polish aircraft in the Atlantic Ocean.

Design
German Type VIIC/41 submarines were preceded by the heavier Type VIIC submarines. U-321 had a displacement of  when at the surface and  while submerged. She had two shafts and two  propellers.

U-321 was fitted with five  torpedo tubes (four fitted at the bow and one at the stern), fourteen torpedoes, one  SK C/35 naval gun, (220 rounds), one  Flak M42 and two  C/30 anti-aircraft guns. The boat had a complement of between forty-four and sixty.

Service history

The submarine was laid down on 21 January 1943 by the Flender Werke yard at Lübeck as yard number 321, launched on 27 November 1943 and commissioned on 20 January 1944 under the command of Kapitänleutnant Ulrich Drews.

She served with the 4th U-boat Flotilla for training, from 20 January 1944 to 28 February 1945 and the 11th flotilla for operations until her sinking on 2 April 1945.

1st patrol
U-321 departed Kiel on 1 March 1945 and arrived in Horten Naval Base (south of Oslo), on the 9th.

2nd patrol and loss
The boat left Horten on 15 March 1945. On 2 April she was sunk by a Vickers Wellington of No. 304 Polish Bomber Squadron southwest of Ireland.

Forty-one men died; there were no survivors.

See also
 Battle of the Atlantic (1939-1945)

References

Bibliography

External links

German Type VIIC/41 submarines
U-boats commissioned in 1944
1943 ships
World War II submarines of Germany
Ships built in Lübeck
U-boats sunk by depth charges
U-boats sunk by Polish aircraft
Ships lost with all hands
U-boats sunk in 1945
Maritime incidents in April 1945